The 1983 Trans America Athletic Conference baseball tournament was held at Centenary Park on the campus of Centenary College of Louisiana in Shreveport, Louisiana, from May 2 through 4.  This was the fifth tournament championship held by the Trans America Athletic Conference, in its fifth year of existence.   won their third tournament championship.

Format
The teams played an 8-team double-elimination tournament, involving all teams in the conference.

Bracket

All-Tournament Team
The following players were named to the All-Tournament Team.  No MVP was named until 1985.

References

Tournament
ASUN Conference Baseball Tournament
Trans America Athletic Conference baseball tournament
Trans America Athletic Conference baseball tournament